Batu Lintang may refer to:
Batu Lintang (state constituency), represented in the Sarawak State Legislative Assembly
Batu Lintang camp, a Japanese internment camp holding both Allied POWs and civilians during the Second World War